Yemets Leonid Oleksandrovych (30 August 1979) is a Ukrainian lawyer and politician, People's Deputy of Ukraine of the 7th and 8th convocations. Deputy of the City Council of the IX convocation from the European Solidarity.

During the 2004 presidential elections, Leonid Emets was a trustee of the presidential candidate Viktor Yushchenko in 219 by the Policy district, headed the headquarters of Yushchenko in the Pechersky district of Kyiv. He also was the commandant of the part of the Orange Revolution. In 2006, Emets became a deputy of the Pechersk District Council, where he headed the faction of Our Ukraine.

During the 2014 Maidan revolution, he was responsible for the forensic support of the activists of Euromaidan and AutoMaidan.

Personal life
On February 14, 2014, Leonid Yemets married Svitlana Taratorina. The wedding took place on Maidan Nezalezhnosti.

References 

1979 births
Seventh convocation members of the Verkhovna Rada
Eighth convocation members of the Verkhovna Rada
Living people